The General Electric/Allison J33 is an American centrifugal-flow jet engine, a development of the General Electric J31, enlarged to produce significantly greater thrust, starting at  and ending at  with an additional low-altitude boost to  with water-alcohol injection.

Development
The J33 was originally developed by General Electric as a follow-on to their work with the designs of Frank Whittle during World War II. Their first engine was known as the General Electric I-A, but after major changes to adapt it to US production and to increase thrust, it started limited production as the I-16 in 1942, the 16 referring to its  thrust. Full production started as the J31 when the United States Army Air Forces introduced common naming for all their engine projects.

Along with the I-16, GE also started work on an enlarged version, known as the I-40. As the name implied, the engine was designed to provide . Apart from size, the main difference between I-16 and the I-40 was the combustion system: the I-16 had ten reverse-flow cans, whereas the I-40 had 14 straight-through combustors. The development cycle was remarkably rapid. Design work started in mid-1943 and the first prototype underwent static testing on 13 January 1944.

Production of the H-1 by Allis-Chalmers ran into delays, and since the I-40 would dramatically improve performance, plans were made to fit the prototypes with the I-40 instead.

The I-40 became important to the USAAF's plans when the I-16 powered P-59 was skipped over in favor of the I-40 powered P-80 as the US's first production jet fighter. In 1945, the license to actually produce the engine was not given to General Electric, but to Allison instead. Allison, working largely from government-owned wartime factories, could produce the engine in quantity more quickly and cheaply.

By the time the production lines were shut down, Allison had built over 6,600 J33's and General Electric another 300 (mostly the early runs).

In 1958, surplus J33s were used in jet donkeys pushing dead loads at 200 knots to test aircraft carrier arresting gear cables and tailhooks at Lakehurst.

A model of the J33 intended for civil use, designated the Allison 400-C4, in 1948 became the first US gas turbine certificated for commercial transport use.

Variants

Data from: Aircraft engines of the World 1953, Aircraft engines of the World 1957, Aircraft engines of the World 1953,
J33-A-4 similar to -21 without water injection.
J33-A-6 , United States Navy (USN)
J33-A-8 , (USN)
J33-A-10 , (USN) Used as mixed propulsion engine system with P&W R-4360 on Martin P4M
J33-A-14 A short life engine powering the Chance-Vought Regulus,  thrust.
J33-A-16 Similar to the -16A, 
J33-A-16A Powering the Grumman F9F-7,  thrust.
J33-A-17similar to -21 without water injection
J33-A-17A
J33-A-18A A short life engine powering the Chance-Vought Regulus.
J33-A-20
J33-A-21  thrust.
J33-A-22 Powering the Lockheed T2V-1 with bleed air for boundary-layer control.
J33-A-23 similar to -35,  thrust.
J33-A-24  thrust, powers the Lockheed T2V.
J33-A-24A  thrust, powers the Lockheed T2V.
J33-A-25 similar to -35
J33-A-27 United States Air Force (USAF), similar to the -16A,
J33-A-29  re-heat thrust.
J33-A-31 similar to -35
J33-A-33  re-heat thrust.
J33-A-35  thrust /  with water-alcohol injection, powers the Lockheed T2V and Lockheed T-33.
J33-A-37 A short life engine powering the Martin Matador,  thrust.
Model 400-C4Company designation, for commercial use, similar to J33-A-21.
Model 400-C5Company designation of J33-A-23.
Model 400-C13Company designation of the -35
Model 400-D9Company designation of the -33

Applications
 Convair XF-92
 Lockheed P-80 Shooting Star
 Lockheed T-33 Shooting Star
 Lockheed F-94A / F-94B Starfire
 North American AJ Savage
 Martin P4M Mercator
 MGM-1 Matador
 MGM-13 Mace
 SSM-N-8 Regulus

Specifications (Allison J33-A-35)

See also

References

Further reading

External links

 J33 on LeteckeMotory.cz (cs)

J33
1940s turbojet engines
Centrifugal-flow turbojet engines